Park Ji-soo (born July 22, 1988) is a South Korean actress. Park made her official acting debut as the title character in Mai Ratima, the feature directorial debut of actor-director Yoo Ji-tae.

Filmography

Film

Television series

Awards and nominations

References

External links 
 Ji Soo Park at C&CO ENS
  
  
 
 
 

1988 births
Living people
South Korean film actresses
South Korean television actresses
Korea National University of Arts alumni
People from Seoul